This is a list of universities in Wallis and Futuna.

Universities 
 University de Wallis

See also 
 List of universities by country

References

Universities
Wallis and Futuna
Wallis and Futuna

Universities